Haitske Pijlman (16 June 1954) is a retired speed skater from the Netherlands who was active between 1975 and 1980. She competed at the 1980 Winter Olympics in the 500 and 1000 m and finished in 15th and 14th place, respectively. She won a bronze medal at the World Sprint Speed Skating Championships for Women in 1977. 

She married Jos Valentijn, also a competitive speed skater; their daughter Rikst Valentijn is an artistic gymnast.

Personal bests: 
500 m – 42.44 (1980)
 1000 m – 1:25.54 (1980)
 1500 m – 2:14.77 (1979)
 3000 m – 4:49.05 (1976)

References

1954 births
Living people
Dutch female speed skaters
Olympic speed skaters of the Netherlands
Speed skaters at the 1980 Winter Olympics
Sportspeople from Friesland
People from Boarnsterhim
20th-century Dutch women
21st-century Dutch women